Vitali Semyonovich Davydov (born 1 April 1939) is a retired ice hockey player who played in the Soviet Hockey League. He was born in Moscow, and played his entire club career for HC Dynamo Moscow. He was inducted into the Russian and Soviet Hockey Hall of Fame in 1963.

References 
 

1939 births
Communist Party of the Soviet Union members
HC Dynamo Moscow players
Ice hockey players at the 1964 Winter Olympics
Ice hockey players at the 1968 Winter Olympics
Ice hockey players at the 1972 Winter Olympics
IIHF Hall of Fame inductees
Living people
Honoured Masters of Sport of the USSR
Merited Coaches of the Soviet Union
Recipients of the Order "For Merit to the Fatherland", 4th class
Recipients of the Order of the Red Banner of Labour
Medalists at the 1964 Winter Olympics
Medalists at the 1968 Winter Olympics
Medalists at the 1972 Winter Olympics
Olympic gold medalists for the Soviet Union
Olympic ice hockey players of the Soviet Union
Olympic medalists in ice hockey
Soviet ice hockey defencemen
Ice hockey people from Moscow